Blackton Reservoir is a reservoir in County Durham, England. It is situated in Baldersdale, about 4 miles (7 km) west of Cotherstone, where the River Balder joins the River Tees.

It is owned by Northumbrian Water and supplies water for Teesdale.

Blackton is one of a series of reservoirs on the same stretch of the Balder, located immediately downstream of the larger Balderhead Reservoir and being almost continuous with Hury Reservoir further downstream.

See also
 List of reservoirs and dams in the United Kingdom

Drinking water reservoirs in England
Reservoirs in County Durham